Nikolay Vikhor (born March 10, 1954, in Moscow) is a retired male discus thrower. He represented the Soviet Union at the 1976 Summer Olympics in Montreal, where he ended up in 21st place in the overall-rankings. Vikhor is best known for winning the gold medal in the men's discus event at the 1977 Summer Universiade in Sofia, Bulgaria.

References
sports-reference

1954 births
Living people
Russian male discus throwers
Soviet male discus throwers
Athletes (track and field) at the 1976 Summer Olympics
Olympic athletes of the Soviet Union
Athletes from Moscow
Universiade medalists in athletics (track and field)
Universiade gold medalists for the Soviet Union
Medalists at the 1977 Summer Universiade